Galeruca tanaceti is a species of leaf beetle found in the Palearctic realm, and is the type species of the genus Galeruca. It was first described by Carl Linnaeus in his 1758 10th edition of Systema Naturae.

Distribution
This species is present in the Palearctic realm from Portugal to Japan. It is also present in the Near East and in North Africa. It has been introduced in northern America.

Habitat
These beetles inhabit dry and sunny areas, meadows and grassy places.

Description
These leaf beetles have a broadly ovate, convex and glabrous body. The head, pronotum and elytra are matt black and densely punctured. Lateral margins of the elytra are explanate. Also legs are entirely black, relatively long and slender.

The females are longer than the males. At the time of oviposition the abdomen is greatly enlarged and filled with eggs so much that the elytra cover just one half of the length of the belly. The larvae are dark, covered with bristles on fleshy outgrowths.

Biology
Adults can be found between June and August persisting until October. Eggs are laid during September or October. They are attached to a leaf, a stem or flowers of dry grasses and other herbaceous plants and are protected by the secretion of these beetle. The larvae emerge only after the winter, at the end of April and during May. Pupation occurs  in the ground during late May or June.

Beetles and larvae are polyphagous, feeding on Asteraceae (Tanacetum vulgare, Achillea millefolium, Centaurea nigra, Tussilago, Cirsium arvense), Brassicaceae (Cardamine pratensis, Sinapis arvensis) and other plants (especially Potentilla auserina, Succisa pratensis, Scabiosa columbaria, Thymus serpyllum, Veronica and Hypericum perforatum).

These beetles have been reported as a pest on oregano in Crete.

Eggs have been observed being parasitized by Oomyzus galerucivorus (Hymenoptera: Eulophidae).

Gallery

References

Galerucinae
Articles containing video clips
Beetles described in 1758
Taxa named by Carl Linnaeus
Beetles of Europe
Beetles of Asia
Beetles of North Africa